Mirza Ghalib Museum, New Delhi is a museum on the life and times of the 18th century Urdu poet Mirza Ghalib, under the aegis of the Ghalib Academy, New Delhi. The museum is situated in the vicinity of the tomb of the 13th century Sufi saint Khwaja Nizamuddin.

About
The museum is housed on the third floor of the Ghalib Academy building. It was formally declared open by the 3rd President of India Dr. Zakir Hussain on the occasion of the Ghalib Centenary on 22 February 1969. The museum presents pictures of Ghalib's residences, food habits and attires of the poet and his times. There are seals, coins dating to the mughal era, Postage stamps and specimen of handwriting housed in this museum. Paintings of renowned artists like those of M.F. Hussain, Satish Gujral, Anis Farooqui are some of the main attractions of the museum. Ghalib's poetry calligraphy and other artworks based on Ghalib's poetry are also on display.

The mausoleum of Mirza Ghalib is just next to the Academy building. It lies in the attached courtyard of the building just on the way to the dargah of Nizamuddin. Humayun's Tomb is also within walking distance from the museum.

Gallery

Artefacts
Calligraphy Works

Letters

Stamps

Coins

Postage Stamps
To remember and commemorate Ghalib, postage stamps were issued not only in India but also in Pakistan as can be seen by the stamps exhibited

See also

 Ghalib
 Ghalib Academy, New Delhi
 Ghalib ki Haveli

References

Museums established in 1969
Museums in Delhi
Biographical museums in India
Ghalib
1969 establishments in Delhi